Mehmet Ufuk Uras (born January 4, 1959, in Üsküdar, Istanbul, Turkey) is a Turkish left-libertarian politician and economist.

Biography and political career
Uras graduated from the Faculty of Economics of Istanbul University and began working as an academician at the same institution. A former leader of the now-defunct University Lecturers' Union (Öğretim Elemanları Sendikası), he was elected the chairman of Freedom and Solidarity Party (ÖDP) in 1996. Uras resigned from the leadership after the 2002 general election. He became the party chairman again in 2007.

2007 elections and after
Uras ran a successful campaign an independent and a "common candidate of the Left" within the Thousand Hopes alliance, backed by Kurdish-based Democratic Society Party and several left-wing, environmentalist and pro-peace groups in the 2007 general election, polling 81,486 votes, which is approximately 4 per cent of the vote in his constituency. After having elected as an independent to the parliament he rejoined the ÖDP.

He was removed from his post as the ÖDP party leader in 2009, when his opponent Hayri Kozanoğlu was elected. He resigned from the Freedom and Solidarity Party on 19 June 2009.

After the Democratic Society Party was dissolved in December 2009 and two of its MPs were banned from politics for five years, he joined forces with the remaining Kurdish MPs in the Peace and Democracy Party group, giving them the twenty seats necessary to retain their position as a parliamentary party.

Post-parliamentarian political life
Uras did not run in the 2011 general election. On 25 November 2012, he became a co-founder and member of Greens and the Left Party of the Future, founded as a merger of the Greens and the Equality and Democracy Party.

Personal life
Uras is married to ballet dancer and choreographer Zeynep Tanbay. 
Uras has a son named Deniz from a former marriage.

Books
 ÖDP Söyleşileri, 1999, Istanbul: Alan. 
 Başka Bir Siyaset Mümkün, 2003, Istanbul: İthaki. 
 İdeolojilerin Sonu mu?, 2004, Istanbul: Çiviyazıları. 
 Sezgiciliğin Sonu mu?, 2005, Istanbul: Devin. 
 Siyaset Yazıları, 2005, Istanbul: Alan. 
 Alternatif Siyaset Arayışları, 2005, Istanbul: İthaki. 
 "Kurtuluş Savaşı'nda Sol", 2007, İstanbul: Altın Kitaplar. 
 "Sokaktan Parlamentoya Özgürlükçü Siyaset İçin Notlar", 2008, İstanbul: Su Yayınları. 
 "Söz Meclisten Dışarı", 2010, Ankara: Penta Yayınları.   
 "Meclis Notları", 2013, İstanbul: Pencere Yayınları. 
"Velhasıl",2018, İstanbul, Doğan Kitap.

References

1959 births
Living people
People from Üsküdar
Istanbul University alumni
Academic staff of Istanbul University
Turkish economists
Turkish non-fiction writers
Libertarian socialists
Kadıköy Anadolu Lisesi alumni
Democratic Regions Party politicians
Turkish socialists
Deputies of Istanbul
Leaders of political parties in Turkey
Members of the 23rd Parliament of Turkey